Edwin Noel (born April 22, 1950 in Trinidad) is a retired sprinter from Trinidad and Tobago who specialized in the 200 metres.

Achievements

External links
Best of Trinidad

1950 births
Living people
Trinidad and Tobago male sprinters
Athletes (track and field) at the 1978 Commonwealth Games
Athletes (track and field) at the 1979 Pan American Games
Athletes (track and field) at the 1980 Summer Olympics
Olympic athletes of Trinidad and Tobago
Commonwealth Games silver medallists for Trinidad and Tobago
Pan American Games competitors for Trinidad and Tobago
Commonwealth Games medallists in athletics
Central American and Caribbean Games gold medalists for Trinidad and Tobago
Competitors at the 1978 Central American and Caribbean Games
Central American and Caribbean Games medalists in athletics
Medallists at the 1978 Commonwealth Games